Richard Cambridge is a film actor and producer, known for feature film Golden Years (2016), Hollyoaks (1995 TV series) and The IT Crowd (2006).

Biography
Richard is CTO of actors community WeAudition. Founded in 2015, Richard with actor partners Jessica Rose and Darren Darnborough founded Weaudition.com, a network for actors looking for scene readers, to help actors learn lines from a script.

He is best known for playing the role of Pete Webster in Hollyoaks and his role in The IT Crowd.

He has also appeared in a US commercial for Butterfinger candy bars.

He also appeared in Miburn's music video for "What Will You Do (When the Money Goes)?" in 2007.

In 2019, he played an agent in a TV ad for Zovirax.

Richard is a keen supporter of mental health and kidney charities. On his 22nd birthday, he had a nine-hour operation to remove his right kidney.

Filmography

References

External links

1977 births
Living people
English male actors